Alexandros Laliotis (born September 10, 1972) is a retired amateur Greek freestyle wrestler, who competed in the men's heavyweight category. Laliotis has been selected to the nation's Olympic wrestling team when Greece hosted the 2004 Summer Olympics in Athens, and also trained for Iraklis Wrestling Club in Thessaloniki, under his personal coach Panagiotis Koutsopakis.

Laliotis qualified for the men's heavyweight class (96 kg), when Greece welcomed the world to the 2004 Summer Olympics in Athens. He filled up an entry by the International Federation of Association Wrestling and the Hellenic Olympic Committee, as Greece received an automatic berth for being the host nation. Amassed the home crowd inside Ano Liossia Olympic Hall, Laliotis opened the prelim pool with a shut out victory over China's Wang Yuanyuan by a tough 3–2 verdict, before losing in overtime of his succeeding match 1–4 to Slovakia's Peter Pecha. Placing third in the pool based on technical points and thirteenth overall, Laliotis failed to advance further into the medal rounds.

References

External links
Profile – International Wrestling Database

1972 births
Living people
Greek male sport wrestlers
Olympic wrestlers of Greece
Wrestlers at the 2004 Summer Olympics
Sportspeople from Serres
21st-century Greek people